George Arthur Rogers (born September 14, 1958) is a politician from Leduc, Alberta. After serving on city council from 1992 to 1998, he was mayor of Leduc from 1998 to 2004. From 2004 to 2015 he served as MLA for the riding of Leduc-Beaumont.

Early life
George Rogers was born in Jamaica and immigrated to Canada in 1975.  Rogers is a father of three children and a very active community volunteer.

Rogers graduated from Leduc Senior High School in 1977 and from Northern Alberta Institute of Technology in 1980 with a diploma in business administration with an accounting major. In 1988 he received his certificate in local government studies from the University of Alberta.

Following graduation Rogers worked in the oil industry in various accounting positions up to the rank of assistant controller.

Political career
In 1986, Rogers joined the city of Leduc as assistant treasurer and after three years moved to Redcliff, Alberta, where, as municipal administrator, he handled the roles of secretary-treasurer and assistant town manager.

In 1992, he returned home to Leduc to start a real estate sales career with Royal LePage and subsequently ran for city council in the fall of that year. He was elected in 1992 and again in 1995.

In October 1998, he was elected mayor and re-elected in October 2001.

He served as a board member of the Alberta Urban Municipalities association from 1993 to 2003, serving as president from 2001 to 2003; also serving as a board member of the Federation Of Canadian Municipalities representing Alberta. For this work, he was recognized by Alberta Venture Magazine as one of Alberta's 50 Most influential People in 2003

Rogers was elected to his first term as the Member of the Legislative Assembly for Leduc-Beaumont-Devon on November 22, 2004 and subsequently re-elected in 2008 and 2012. On December 15, 2006, he was appointed a member of the Treasury Board. In addition to his role as MLA, he served as Deputy Speaker (May 23, 2012 to May 5, 2015) and Chair of committees, has served as deputy chair of the Alberta Heritage Savings Trust Fund Committee, and a member of the Private Bills Committee, the Standing Committee on Managing Growth Pressures, Chair of the Cabinet Policy Committee on Public health And safety, as a member of The Legislative Policy Committee on Alberta's Economic Future, The Legislative Offices committee, Chair of The Chief Electoral Officer Search Committee, and Chair of The Ethics Commissioner Search Committee.

In the 2015 election, Rogers was defeated by New Democrat Shaye Anderson.

Electoral history

2004 general election

2008 general election

2012 general election

2015 general election

References

External links
 Profile at the Legislative Assembly of Alberta

Living people
Mayors of places in Alberta
People from Leduc, Alberta
Progressive Conservative Association of Alberta MLAs
Black Canadian politicians
Northern Alberta Institute of Technology alumni
1958 births
Black Canadian businesspeople
21st-century Canadian politicians
Jamaican emigrants to Canada